Korabelnoye is a rural locality (an inhabited locality) in administrative jurisdiction of the closed administrative-territorial formation of Ostrovnoy in Murmansk Oblast, Russia, located beyond the Arctic Circle on the Kola Peninsula at a height of  above sea level. As of the 2010 Census, its population was 10.

References

Notes

Sources

Official website of Murmansk Oblast. Registry of the Administrative-Territorial Structure of Murmansk Oblast 

Rural localities in Murmansk Oblast